, known under the pen name , is a Japanese manga artist. His most notable work was the sports manga Dan Doh!!, written by Nobuhiro Sakata, in which he was the illustrator.

Biography
In 1991, Banjo won the 21st Shogakukan New Artist Award for "Feron 11" as well as an honorable mention for the "Fujiko Fujio Award". That same year, one of his works appeared in the CoroCoro Comic Summer Special. After graduating from Seinan Gakuin University, he worked as an assistant to Takashi Shiina. In 1992 he made his formal debut under the pen name "Daichi Banjō" with the short story "Puma" in a special issue of Shōnen Sunday. In 1995, he became the illustrator for the Dan Doh!! sports manga series written by Nobuhiro Sakata. The series ran from 1995 to 2000 on Weekly Shonen Jump for 29 tankōbon volumes and its sequels Dan Doh! Xi and Dan Doh! Next Generation ran in Shonen Sunday from 2000 to 2005 for 15 and 4 volumes, respectively. It was also adapted into an anime series.  In 2006, he worked on the series Bushin which was serialized in Weekly Shonen Sunday. Other manga series include Mobile Suit Gundam: The Hunters in Black and Mobile Suit Gundam Aggressor.

Works

References

External links
 

1969 births
Living people
People from Tokyo
Manga artists from Tokyo